Logik may refer to:

 LoGIK, the GIK Institute Clock Tower in Topi, Pakistan
 Logik (book), an 1890 book by Alois Höfler and Alexius Meinong 
 Logik (brand), an electronics brand of Dixons Retail
 Logik (poem)

See also 
 Logic (disambiguation)